was a Japanese novelist and poet active during the Taishō and Shōwa periods of Japan. His works are known for their explorations of melancholy. He won the 4th Yomiuri Prize.

Selected works
 The House of a Spanish Dog, 西班牙犬の家, 1914.
 Melancholy in the Country, 田園の憂鬱, 1919.

References

External links
 
 
 新宮市立佐藤春夫記念館 – Shingu City Sato Haruo Memorial Museum

20th-century Japanese novelists
Keio University alumni
Academic staff of Keio University
People from Wakayama Prefecture
Yomiuri Prize winners
Recipients of the Order of Culture
1892 births
1964 deaths
20th-century Japanese poets
People from Shingū, Wakayama